Mounira Maya Charrad (born 1942) is a Franco-Tunisian sociologist who serves as associate professor of sociology at the University of Texas at Austin.

She is an author whose work focuses on political sociology, comparative history, gender politics, and the Middle East. Her research has centered on state formation, colonialism, law, citizenship, kinship, and women's rights.

Early life and education
Charrad was born in Tunisia on August 10, 1942. She received an undergraduate degree from the Sorbonne in Paris, France, and a Doctor of Philosophy degree from Harvard University.

Career
Her book States and Women's Rights (2001) considers strategies of state building in kin-based societies and how struggles over state power shaped the expansion or curtailment of women's rights.

Charrad studies conceptions of modernity in legal discourses in the Middle East. Challenging explanations of politics based on a textual approach to religion, she offers instead a focus on social solidarities and where they are grounded (kinship, ethnicity, or other), as for example in her articles "Gender in the Middle East: Islam, State, Agency" and "Central and Local Patrimonialism: State Building in Kin-Based Societies".

Her work has been translated into French and Arabic, and featured on websites including the International Museum of Women and in the media.

Charrad's research has been funded by several grants, including the National Endowment for the Humanities, the Mellon Foundation, the American Association of University Women, and the American Institute of Maghribi Studies.

At the University of Texas at Austin, she is affiliated with the Center for European Studies, the Center for Middle East Studies, the Center for Women's and Gender Studies, the Rapoport Center for Human Rights and Justice, and the Center for Russian, East European, and Eurasian Studies. She also holds a courtesy appointment in the Department of Middle East Studies.

Recognition
Charrad's book States and Women's Rights: The Making of Postcolonial Tunisia, Algeria and Morocco (University of California Press, 2001) won the following awards:

 Distinguished Scholarly Book Award, American Sociological Association
 Best Book on Politics and History Greenstone Award, American Political Science Association
 Distinguished Contribution to Scholarship Award. Outstanding Book in Political Sociology, American Sociological Association, Section on Political Sociology
 Outstanding Scholarly Book in Any Field Hamilton Award, University of Texas at Austin
 Best First Book in the Field of History Award, Phi Alpha Theta, 2002
 Best Book in Sociology Komarovsky Award, Honorable Mention, Eastern Sociological Society, 2003

The book is being translated into French, Arabic, and Chinese.

Selected other publications
 
Expanded as: 
Revised and reprinted as: 
 
  
 
  Pdf.
Revised and reprinted in 
 
 
Including: 
 
 
Including: 
Including:

See also
 List of sociologists
 List of University of Texas at Austin faculty

References

External links
 University of Texas at Austin faculty profile
 WorldCat references

1942 births
20th-century social scientists
20th-century Tunisian women writers
20th-century Tunisian writers
21st-century social scientists
21st-century Tunisian women writers
21st-century Tunisian writers
American sociologists
American women sociologists
American women political scientists
American political scientists
Harvard University alumni
Living people
Political sociologists
Tunisian academics
Tunisian non-fiction writers
Tunisian people of French descent
Tunisian sociologists
Tunisian women scientists
University of Paris alumni
University of Texas at Austin faculty
Women's studies academics
Tunisian emigrants to the United States
Tunisian expatriates in France
21st-century American women